Cold Fever is a 1995 Icelandic film directed by Friðrik Þór Friðriksson. It is a road movie set in Iceland and was the first of Friðrik's films to be made in the English language. The movie depicts the travels of a Japanese man across Iceland. It was jokingly promoted as the best Icelandic-Japanese road movie of 1995.

Synopsis
Hirata is a successful Japanese businessman whose plan for a two-week winter holiday in Hawaii to play golf changes when his elderly grandfather reminds him that he should go to Iceland.

Hirata's parents died there seven years ago, and the seven-year anniversary of a death is a significant event in Japanese culture. Hirata must perform a ceremony in the river where they died after drowning in an avalanche – the drowned must be fed by the surviving family members if they are to find peace.

Hirata arrives in Reykjavík, Iceland. His final destination is a remote river on the far side of the island. He encounters one mishap and misadventure after another. He first accidentally gets on a wrong bus filled with German tourists traveling to see the hot springs. He also confronts a language barrier; Hirata cannot speak any Icelandic, and knows very little English. After his first day's misadventures, Hirata decides to purchase an ancient, bright red Citroën DS to make the journey. During the long drive, Hirata meets several strange people along the way. These include the mystical woman who sells him the car, that only plays one radio station. Next, Hirata meets a local woman who collects photographs of funerals. The following day, Hirata meets Jack and Jill, two American hitchhikers, who turn out to be armed and dangerous fugitives who proceed to steal his car. Nearing his destination on foot, Hirata arrives in a small village where he meets an old man named Siggi, the owner of a local lodge who teaches Hirata how to drink the most potent alcoholic beverage in Iceland.

After explaining his determination to travel to where his parents died, Hirata is aided by Siggi who borrows a pair of Icelandic horses from a local farmer, and the two of them travel on horseback to Hirata's destination. After riding across an ice cap glacier, over a ridge and into the valley where Hirata's parents died, he dismounts and tells Siggi that he must go on alone to complete his journey. After traversing a rickety bridge to the river, Hirata arrives at the river bank where he performs his cleansing ceremony at last. He then rejoins Siggi waiting for him and they both ride on their horses down a gully where they make it to a beach and the final shot shows them riding down the coast towards a nearby coastal village which hopefully will have a ferry to take Hirata back to Reykjavík and presumably back to Japan.

Credits

Cast
Masatoshi Nagase: Hirata
Lili Taylor: Jill
Fisher Stevens: Jack
Gísli Halldórsson: Siggi
Seijun Suzuki: Grandfather
Laura Huges: Laura
Jóhannes B. Guðmundsson: Old Man
Bríet Héðinsdóttir: Old Woman
Guðmundur Karl Sigurdórsson: Guest at Thorrablot (uncredited)
Magnús Ólafsson
Rúrik Haraldsson
Flosi Ólafsson: Hotel owner
Ari Matthíasson
Álfrún Örnólfsdóttir
Hallbjörn Hjartarson: Cowboy of the North
Katrín Ólafsdóttir

Crew
 Director: Friðrik Þór Friðriksson
 Screenplay: Jim Stark and Friðrik Þór Friðriksson
 Producer: Jim Stark
 Co-producer: George Gund III
 Executive producer: Reinhard Brundig, Peter Aalbæk Jensen, and Christa Saredi
 Line producer: Ari Kristinsson
 Director of Photography: Ari Kristinsson
 Production Designer: Árni Páll Jóhannsson
 Editor: Steingrímur Karlsson
 Film edition: Steingrímur Karlsson
 Sound Design: Kjartan Kjartansson
 Sound edition: Ingvar Lundberg
 Music: Hilmar Örn Hilmarsson
 Featuring “Killer Boogie” by Þeyr
 Costume design: María Ólafsdóttir
 Production manager: Inga Björk Sólnes
 Gaffer: Andreas Burkhard
 Generator operator: Eggert Einarsson
 Still photography: Mark Higashino
 Script supervisor: Inga Lísa Middleton
 Colour grader: Petra Schütt
 Production: Icelandic Film Corporation, Iciclefilm, Pandora Film, Sunrice Inc., Zentropa Entertainments, George Gund III
 Support: Film Fond of Hamburg

Critical response 
On review aggregator website Rotten Tomatoes, the film holds an approval rating of 95% based on 20 reviews, and an average rating of 7.5/10.

See also
The Goddess of 1967, another movie in which a successful Japanese man travels foreign land in a newly purchased bright (this time pink) 1967 Citroen DS and meets strange characters, though this time in Australia.

References

External links
 Cold Fever at the Icelandic Film Corporation
 
 
 Cold Fever at the Shopicelandic.com

1995 films
1990s adventure films
1995 comedy-drama films
English-language Icelandic films
1990s Icelandic-language films
Icelandic independent films
1990s road movies
Films directed by Friðrik Þór Friðriksson
Films scored by Hilmar Örn Hilmarsson
Films set in Iceland
Japan in non-Japanese culture
1990s English-language films
1995 multilingual films
Icelandic multilingual films